Nea Kios, is a small town and former municipality in Argolis, Peloponnese, Greece. Since the 2011 local government reform it is part of the municipality Argos-Mykines, of which it is a municipal unit. The emblem of the town is Argo. The municipal unit has an area of 5.700 km2. It was founded by refugees from Cius in Bithynia after the expulsion of the Greeks from Asia Minor.

Geography
Nea Kios is situated in a plain on the coast of the Argolic Gulf, at the mouth of the rivers Inachos and Erasinos. The rivers' waters create marsh in the surrounding area.
It is 4 km northwest of Myloi, 6 km south of Argos and 6 km northwest of Nafplio. It is considered the seaport of Argos. Near Nea Kios is the site of the ancient town of Temenium.

History
Nea Kios is historical continuation of Cius of Asia Minor, city of 15,000 residents built at the head of the gulf of Cius in Propontis, seat of the Metropolis of Nicaea and seaport of Bursa. Refugees of Cius, after the Asia Minor disaster of 1922, transferred to Kalamaria where they stayed few years before most of them move out for Argolis when they were given space to settle.

The establishment of Nea Kios started in 1926, following the actions of special commission following the actions of a special committee set up in 1925, chaired by Christos Delis. The settlement began in 1927 and was recognized as a settlement in 1928. Due to the swampy area, it took a lot of effort and sacrifice to become a model town, as it is characterized.

Historical population
Since its establishment, the actual population of Nea Kios according to ELSTAT is:

Culture
Since 1982 a museum operates in Nea Kios, named Laskarideio Folklore Museum, which houses costumes and various items from Cius of Asia Minor. The name of the museum is a reference to Evristhenis Laskaridis, a doctor who published books on the history of Cius.

Sports
Two sport clubs are based at Nea Kios, A.C. Argonaftis Nea Kios (="Α.Ο. Αργοναύτης Νέας Κίου"), established in 1933 and Nea Kios Sports Club (="Αθλητικός Όμιλος Νέας Κίου"), established in 1979, which operates under Argonaftis.

Town partnerships
Nea Kios fosters partnerships with the following places:
 Meddersheim, Rhineland-Palatinate, Germany
The partnership agreement between Nea Kios and Meddersheim was read out by mayors Georgios Maninis (Nea Kios) and Tilo Krauß (Meddersheim) and signed amid much festivity on 15 July 2008 in Meddersheim.

References

See also

List of settlements in Argolis

Populated places in Argolis